The Montague Street Bridge is a railway bridge in South Melbourne, Australia, an inner suburb of Melbourne. The bridge is located at 83 Montague Street, between Woodgate Street and Gladstone Lane.

This has made the bridge a local landmark and the subject of much humorous media discussion.

History
Construction firm Johns & Waygood was contracted to build the bridge in 1914 as part of the infrastructure of the Port Melbourne railway line. Montague Railway Station was located just south of the bridge and mainly served workers at nearby factories.

Flooding on Montague Street was a perennial problem; in 1916, the area around the bridge was under a foot of water and pedestrians could not approach it. In 1934, South Melbourne council raised the underlying street level by about two feet, thus reducing the clearance height of the bridge.

The last passenger train ran to Montague station on 10 October 1987 after it was announced that the line would be converted to light rail. The replacement light rail line was officially opened on 18 December 1987. Currently the bridge carries trams along route 109 between Box Hill and Port Melbourne.

The bridge has a long history of vehicle collisions. In 2016 'Patrick' from Epping, a caller to Jon Faine's ABC radio program, reported having witnessed a vehicle hit the bridge in 1929, aged seven. "I was there … and a truck got stuck under that bridge," he recalled. "I said to them, 'why don't you let his tyres down?'," adding that inflatable tyres were only new at the time.

Meanwhile, 'Tony' from Blackburn, who managed the South Melbourne branch of a vehicle hire business during the 1970s, recalled that five or six trucks from his branch would hit the bridge each year. "How long does it take to get something done?" Tony rhetorically asked Faine.

Notable crashes
The impact peeled back the roof of the bus to the fifth row of seats. The driver, Jack Aston, was seriously injured, along with four women and two men, who suffered injuries including head and spinal fractures, broken collarbones and facial lacerations. Aston was convicted of negligently causing serious injury and sentenced to five years' imprisonment, but was released in 2019 after serving 10 months of the sentence when the charges were downgraded on appeal.

Another bus owned by the same company had previously crashed into the bridge in March 2006, but the company did not have a policy to tell its drivers to avoid the area.

On 20 June 2018, dashcam footage captured the moment a truck slammed into the bridge.

Official responses
In June 2016, the Victorian state government installed two warning gantries on the two main approaches to the bridge on Normanby Road and City Road. Black and yellow paddles hang from the gantries to the height of the bridge; if any of the paddles hit a vehicle as it drives under the gantry, this will warn the driver to divert their course to avoid hitting the bridge. Additional signage has been installed in surrounding streets, providing a total of 26 advanced warning signs about the bridge.

Since the installation of the gantries, over a dozen more vehicles crashed into the bridge – including a truck carrying sheets of glass on 13 June 2018.

In the media
Tom Waller is the founder of the website How Many Days Since Montague Street Bridge Has Been Hit, which tracks each "championship title bout" between the bridge and its vehicular opponents. The website has been operating since February 2016 and invites crowdsourced reports of new crashes.

The bridge is also a popular topic for local TV, radio and news media, which note the frequency with which the bridge is hit. In June 2017, the Herald Sun reported, "Montague St bridge hit by truck once again", noting that "Melbourne's most-hit bridge has claimed another victim after it was struck by a truck yet again this afternoon … the third time the bridge has been hit in as many weeks."

Other media reports strike a more jocular tone: in February 2018, youth website Pedestrian.tv reported, "After 8 Months Dormant, The Awful Montague Street Bridge Has Awoken To Feed".

The bridge has its own Twitter account and Facebook page, both of which are written in the first person, as if by the bridge itself.

David Cosma has written a comedic song, 'Montague St Bridge', which includes the lyrics "Is it low?/Is it too low?/I don't know!/But I think I'm gonna go anyway."

Similar bridges

The Napier Street Bridge, located in Footscray, in Melbourne's western suburbs, has a four-metre clearance and is similarly prone to vehicle crashes. Like the Montague Street Bridge, it has its own Twitter account.

The bridge has been struck eight times in 2018. Its days may be numbered, however, as a proposed upgrade to Bayswater railway station will move the station to a new, higher bridge.

The 11 foot 8 Bridge, (formally known as the Norfolk Southern–Gregson Street Overpass, and nicknamed "The Can-Opener"), is a railway bridge in Durham, North Carolina, USA, that averages one crash a month. In October 2019, the bridge was raised  to  but accidents continue.

The "Fools Bridge" in Sofia Street, Saint Petersburg, Russia, also has its own humorous Twitter account. As of 2 February 2018, 140 vehicles had become stuck under the bridge.

See also 
 Montague Street station
 Melbourne tram route 109
 Structure gauge

References

External links
 

Bridges in Melbourne
Bridges with frequent bridge strikes
Buildings and structures in the City of Port Phillip